Ctiboř is a municipality and village in Benešov District in the Central Bohemian Region of the Czech Republic. It has about 200 inhabitants.

Administrative parts
The village of Hrádek is an administrative part of Ctiboř.

Gallery

References

Villages in Benešov District